Monoamine oxidase A, also known as MAO-A, is an enzyme that in humans is encoded by the MAOA gene. This gene is one of two neighboring gene family members that encode mitochondrial enzymes which catalyze the oxidative deamination of amines, such as dopamine, norepinephrine, and serotonin. A mutation of this gene results in Brunner syndrome. This gene has also been associated with a variety of other psychiatric disorders, including antisocial behavior. Alternatively spliced transcript variants encoding multiple isoforms have been observed.

Structures

Gene 
Monoamine oxidase A, also known as MAO-A, is an enzyme that in humans is encoded by the MAOA gene. 
The promoter of MAOA contains conserved binding sites for Sp1, GATA2, and TBP. This gene is adjacent to a related gene (MAOB) on the opposite strand of the X chromosome.

In humans, there is a 30-base repeat sequence repeated several different numbers of times in the promoter region of MAO-A. There are 2R (two repeats), 3R, 3.5R, 4R, and 5R variants of the repeat sequence, with the 3R and 4R variants most common in all populations. The 3.5R and 4R variants have been found to be more highly active than 3R or 5R, in a study which did not examine the 2R variant.

Several studies have found differences in the frequency distribution of variants of the MAOA promoter repeat between ethnic groups: 52-59% of African American men, 48-62% of Chinese men, 62% of Maori men, 57% of Japanese men, and 33-37% of European men carried the 3R allele, while 5.5% of Black men, 0.1% of Caucasian men, and 0.00067% of Asian men carried the 2R allele. However, amongst White European men, there was a large range of variability based on ethnicity. Men from Latin Europe had low instances of the gene, but Central and Eastern European men had higher prevalences of the 3R allele, with Czechs, Polish, and Ukrainians having the higher than average prevalence.

The epigenetic modification of MAOA gene expression through methylation likely plays an important role in women. A study from 2010 found epigenetic methylation of MAOA in men to be very low and with little variability compared to women, while having higher heritability in men than women.

Protein 

The gene encodes a monomeric protein which shares a 70% amino acid sequence identity, as well as conserved chain folds and flavin adenine dinucleotide (FAD)-binding site structures, with MAO-B. However, MAO-A has a monopartite cavity of approximately 550 angstroms, compared to the 290-angstrom bipartite cavity in MAO-B. Nonetheless, both proteins adopt dimeric forms when membrane-bound. The C-terminal domain of MAO-A forms helical tails which are responsible for attaching the protein to the outer mitochondrial membrane (OMM). MAO-A contains loop structures at the entrance of its active site.

Function 

MAO-A is a key regulator for normal brain function. It is a flavoenzyme which degrades amine neurotransmitters, such as dopamine, norepinephrine, and serotonin, via oxidative deamination. It is highly expressed in neural and cardiac cells and localizes to the outer mitochondrial membrane. Its expression is regulated by the transcription factors SP1, GATA2, and TBP via the CAMP pathway in response to stress such as ischemia and inflammation.  One behavioral study suggested a link between the 2R allele and a higher likelihood of violent behavior in adolescents and young adults while another showed no link at all with either antisocial behavior or antisocial alcoholism.

Clinical significance

Cancer 

MAO-A produces an amine oxidase, which is a class of enzyme known to affect carcinogenesis.  Clorgyline, an MAO-A enzyme inhibitor, prevents apoptosis in melanoma cells, in vitro.  Cholangiocarcinoma suppresses MAO-A expression, and those patients with higher MAO-A expression had less adjacent organ invasion and better prognosis and survival.

Cardiovascular disease 

MAOA activity is linked to apoptosis and cardiac damage during cardiac injury following ischemic-reperfusion.

Behavioral and neurological disorders 
There is some association between low activity forms of the MAOA gene and autism. Mutations in the MAOA gene results in monoamine oxidase deficiency, or Brunner syndrome. Other disorders associated with MAO-A include Alzheimer's disease, aggression, panic disorder, bipolar disorder, major depressive disorder, and attention deficit hyperactivity disorder. Effects of parenting on self-regulation in adolescents appear to be moderated by 'plasticity alleles', of which the 2R and 3R alleles of MAOA are two, with "the more plasticity alleles males (but not females) carried, the more and less self-regulation they manifested under, respectively, supportive and unsupportive parenting conditions."

Depression 
MAO-A levels in the brain as measured using positron emission tomography are elevated by an average of 34% in patients with major depressive disorder. Genetic association studies examining the relationship between high-activity MAOA variants and depression have produced mixed results, with some studies linking the high-activity variants to major depression in females, depressed suicide in males, major depression and sleep disturbance in males and major depressive disorder in both males and females.

Other studies failed to find a significant relationship between high-activity variants of the MAOA gene and major depressive disorder. In patients with major depressive disorder, those with MAOA G/T polymorphisms (rs6323) coding for the highest-activity form of the enzyme have a significantly lower magnitude of placebo response than those with other genotypes.

Antisocial behavior 
In humans, an association between the 2R allele of the VNTR region of the gene and an increase in the likelihood of committing serious crime or violence has been found. The VNTR 2R allele of MAOA has been found to be a risk factor for violent delinquency, when present in association with stresses, i.e. family issues, low popularity or failing school.

A connection between the MAO-A gene 3R version and several types of anti-social behaviour has been found: Maltreated children with genes causing high levels of MAO-A were less likely to develop antisocial behavior.  Low MAO-A activity alleles which are overwhelmingly the 3R allele in combination with abuse experienced during childhood resulted in an increased risk of aggressive behaviour as an adult, and men with the low activity MAOA allele were more genetically vulnerable even to punitive discipline as a predictor of antisocial behaviour. High testosterone, maternal tobacco smoking during pregnancy, poor material living standards, dropping out of school, and low IQ predicted violent behavior are associated with men with the low-activity alleles. According to a large meta-analysis in 2014, the 3R allele had a small, nonsignificant effect on aggression and antisocial behavior, in the absence of other interaction factors. Owing to methodological concerns, the authors do not view this as evidence in favor of an effect.

The MAO-A gene was the first candidate gene for antisocial behavior and was identified during a "molecular genetic analysis of a large, multigenerational, and notoriously violent, Dutch kindred". A study of Finnish prisoners revealed that a MAOA-L (low-activity) genotype, which contributes to low dopamine turnover rate, was associated with extremely violent behavior. For the purpose of the study, "extremely violent behavior" was defined as at least ten committed homicides, attempted homicides or batteries.

However, a large genome-wide association study has failed to find any large or statistically significant effects of the MAOA gene on aggression. A separate GWAS on antisocial personality disorder likewise did not report a significant effect of MAOA. Another study, while finding effects from a candidate gene search, failed to find any evidence in a large GWAS. A separate analysis of human and rat genome wide association studies, Mandelian randomization studies, and causal pathway analyses likewise failed to reveal robust evidence of MAOA in aggression. This lack of replication is predicted from the known issues of candidate gene research, which can produce many substantial false positives.

Aggression and the "Warrior gene" 

Low-activity variants of the VNTR promoter region of the MAO-A gene have been referred to as the warrior gene. While almost all humans have a functional MAO-A gene, MAO-A deficiency has been seen in at least 5 families with Brunner syndrome.

Given that MAO-A degrades amine neurotransmitters, gene variants could affect a person's personality or behaviour. When faced with social exclusion or ostracism, individuals with the low activity MAO-A variants showed higher levels of aggression than individuals with the high activity MAO-A gene.  Low activity MAO-A could significantly predict aggressive behaviour in a high provocation situation, but was less associated with aggression in a low provocation situation. Individuals with the low activity variant of the MAO-A gene were just as likely as participants with the high activity variant to retaliate (by administering hot sauce to an opponent) when the loss was small. However, they were more likely (75% as opposed to 62%, out of a sample size of 70) to retaliate and with greater force when the loss was large.

The effects of MAOA genes on aggression have also been criticized for being heavily overstated. Indeed, the MAOA gene, even in conjunction with childhood adversity, is known to have a very small effect. The vast majority of people with the associated alleles have not committed any violent acts.

Legal implications 
In a 2009 criminal trial in the United States, an argument based on a combination of "warrior gene" and history of child abuse was successfully used to avoid a conviction of first-degree murder and the death penalty; however, the convicted murderer was sentenced to 32 years in prison.

Epigenetics 
Studies have linked methylation of the MAOA gene with nicotine and alcohol dependence in women.  A second MAOA VNTR promoter, P2, influences epigenetic methylation and interacts with having experienced child abuse to influence antisocial personality disorder symptoms, only in women.

Animal studies 

A dysfunctional MAOA gene has been correlated with increased aggression levels in mice, and has been correlated with heightened levels of aggression in humans. In mice, a dysfunctional MAOA gene is created through insertional mutagenesis (called 'Tg8'). Tg8 is a transgenic mouse strain that lacks functional MAO-A enzymatic activity. Mice that lacked a functional MAOA gene exhibited increased aggression towards intruder mice.

Some types of aggression exhibited by these mice were territorial aggression, predatory aggression, and isolation-induced aggression. The MAO-A deficient mice that exhibited increased isolation-induced aggression reveals that an MAO-A deficiency may also contribute to a disruption in social interactions. There is research in both humans and mice to support that a nonsense point mutation in the eighth exon of the MAOA gene is responsible for impulsive aggressiveness due to a complete MAO-A deficiency.

Interactions

Transcription factors 

A number of transcription factors bind to the promoter region of MAO-A and upregulate its expression. These include:Sp1 transcription factor, GATA2, TBP.

Inducers 

Synthetic compounds that up-regulate the expression of MAO-A include Valproic acid (Depakote)

Inhibitors 

Substances that inhibit the enzymatic activity of MAO-A include:

Synthetic compounds
 Befloxatone (MD370503)
 Brofaromine (Consonar)
 Cimoxatone
 Clorgyline (irreversible)
 Methylene Blue
 Minaprine (Cantor)
 Moclobemide (Aurorix, Manerix)
 Phenelzine (Nardil)
 Pirlindole (Pirazidol)
 Toloxatone (Humoryl)
 Tyrima (CX 157)
 Tranylcypromine (nonselective and irreversible)
Natural products
 Incarviatone A
Herbal sources
 Garlic (Garlic)
 β-Carboline alkaloids (Syrian Rue, Passion Flower, Tobacco smoke, Ayahuasca)
 Harmine
 Harmaline
 Isoquinoline alkaloids
 Piperine (Black pepper)
 Rosiridin (in vitro)

See also 
 Monoamine oxidase B
 Monoamine oxidase inhibitor - a class of antidepressant drugs that block or inactivate one or both MAO isoforms

References

Further reading

External links 
 

Aggression
EC 1.4.3
Human proteins

de:Warrior Gene